Legislative elections were held in France on 10 November 1946 to elect the first National Assembly of the Fourth Republic. The electoral system used was proportional representation.

After the rejection of a first constitutional draft (5 May 1946 referendum), a new provisional National Assembly was elected to elaborate a second text. The Christian democrat leader Georges Bidault (Popular Republican Movement, MRP) led a government which included socialists (French Section of the Workers' International, SFIO) and Communists (French Communist Party, PCF). This Three-parties alliance proposed the establishment of a parliamentary system.

Advocating a presidential government, General Charles de Gaulle campaigned for a "No" vote. He warned against the "regime of the parties" which was, according to him, responsible for the 1940 collapse. His followers founded the Gaullist Union. The Rally of the Republican Lefts (an electoral alliance dominated by the Radical Party) and the classical Right also campaigned for a "No", because they were opposed to a constitutional change and to the economic policy of the three-parties alliance. Despite this, the second constitutional draft was approved by 13 October 1946 referendum.

The French voters were called to elect the first Assembly of the Fourth Republic. The Three-parties alliance won with a comfortable majority. The PCF regained its position as the largest party to the detriment of the Christian democrats. It obtained the best electoral result in its history. The MRP and the SFIO vote decreased slightly.

Consequently, the PCF leader Maurice Thorez demanded to lead the government but his allies refused. Finally, the SFIO former Prime Minister Léon Blum took the head of the Cabinet. Furthermore, another socialist, Vincent Auriol, was elected President of France. The SFIO benefited from its position in the middle of the governmental alliance. However, the alliance split in due to the 1947 strikes and the beginning of the Cold War. The Communist ministers were dismissed by socialist Prime Minister Paul Ramadier. The SFIO, the MRP, the Radicals and the classical right allied to form the Third Force coalition, against the Communists on the one hand and the Gaullists on the other.

Results

|-
! style="background-color:#E9E9E9;text-align:left;vertical-align:top;" colspan=2 |Parties and coalitions
! style="background-color:#E9E9E9;text-align:right;" | Abbr.
! style="background-color:#E9E9E9;text-align:right;" | Votes
! style="background-color:#E9E9E9;text-align:right;" | %
! style="background-color:#E9E9E9;text-align:right;" | Seats
|-
|style="background-color:#FF0000"|
| style="text-align:left;" | French Communist Party (Parti communiste français)
| style="text-align:right;" | PCF
| style="text-align:right;" | 5,430,593
| style="text-align:right;" | 28.26
| style="text-align:right;" | 182
|-
|style="background-color:#00CCCC"|
| style="text-align:left;" | Popular Republican Movement (Mouvement républicain populaire)
| style="text-align:right;" | MRP
| style="text-align:right;" | 4,988,609
| style="text-align:right;" | 25.96
| style="text-align:right;" | 173
|-
|style="background-color:#E75480"|
| style="text-align:left;" | French Section of the Workers International (Section française de l'Internationale ouvrière)
| style="text-align:right;" | SFIO
| style="text-align:right;" | 3,433,901
| style="text-align:right;" | 17.87
| style="text-align:right;" | 102
|-
|
| style="text-align:left;" | Total "Three-parties alliance"
|
| style="text-align:right;" | 13,853,103
| style="text-align:right;" | 72.09
| style="text-align:right;" | 457
|-
|style="background-color:#1E90FF"|
| style="text-align:left;" | Republican Party of Liberty (Parti républicain de la liberté)
| style="text-align:right;" | PRL
| style="text-align:right;" | 2,487,313
| style="text-align:right;" | 12.94
| style="text-align:right;" | 72
|-
|style="background-color:#FFBF00"|
| style="text-align:left;" | Rally of the Republican Lefts (Rassemblement des gauches républicaines)
| style="text-align:right;" | RGR
| style="text-align:right;" | 2,136,152
| style="text-align:right;" | 11.12
| style="text-align:right;" | 69
|-
|style="background-color:#0000C8"|
| style="text-align:left;" | Gaullist Union (Union gaulliste)
| style="text-align:right;" | UG
| style="text-align:right;" | 585,430
| style="text-align:right;" | 3.05
| style="text-align:right;" | 0
|-
|
| style="text-align:left;" | Miscellaneous
|
| style="text-align:right;" | 154,377
| style="text-align:right;" | 0.80
| style="text-align:right;" | 29
|-
| colspan=2 style="text-align:left;" | Total
|
| style="text-align:right;" | 19,216,375
| style="text-align:right;" | 100
| style="text-align:right;" | 627
|-
| colspan=6 style="text-align:left;" | Abstention: 21.95%
|}

See also
 History of France#Since 1945
 List of elections in 1946
 November 1946 French legislative election in Gabon–Moyen Congo

1946 elections in France
1946-11